George Edwin Bryant (February 11, 1832February 16, 1907) was an American lawyer, judge, and Republican politician.  He served as a Union Army officer during the American Civil War and afterwards served as a brigadier general in the Wisconsin National Guard.  He also served four years in the Wisconsin Legislature, representing Dane County, and was appointed Wisconsin Superintendent of Public Property by Governor Robert M. La Follette, serving from 1901 until his death in 1907.

Biography
Bryant was born on February 11, 1832, in Templeton, Massachusetts. He attended Norwich University. At Norwich, he was a roommate of George Dewey, who went on to become Admiral of the Navy.  On September 27, 1858, Bryant married Susie A. Gibson and they had three children.

Military career
Bryant was initially assigned to the 1st Wisconsin Infantry Regiment of the Union Army during the American Civil War, having previously captained the Madison Guards. Before long, he was given command of the 12th Wisconsin Infantry Regiment. He served until 1864.

In 1880, Bryant became Quartermaster General of the Wisconsin National Guard.

Political career
He was elected county judge of Dane County, Wisconsin, in the Spring 1865 election, and was re-elected in 1869 and 1873, ultimately serving 12 years.  While serving as judge, he was also elected to the Wisconsin State Senate from the 7th State Senate district—which then comprised the eastern half of Dane County—serving in the 1875 and 1876 sessions.  In 1898, he was elected to the Wisconsin State Assembly.  He was a delegate to the 1880 Republican National Convention, and was appointed postmaster of Madison from 1882 through 1886 and again from 1890 to 1894.  In 1900, he was elected chairman of the Republican Party of Wisconsin.  After the Robert M. La Follette was elected governor later that year, however, Bryant was appointed Superintendent of Public Property.

Death and burial
He died on February 16, 1907, and was buried at Forest Hill Cemetery.

References

External links
 The Political Graveyard

|-

People from Templeton, Massachusetts
Politicians from Madison, Wisconsin
Republican Party Wisconsin state senators
Wisconsin state court judges
Wisconsin postmasters
Military personnel from Wisconsin
People of Wisconsin in the American Civil War
Union Army colonels
Norwich University alumni
1832 births
1907 deaths
Burials in Wisconsin
19th-century American politicians
19th-century American judges
Military personnel from Massachusetts